Digital Wildlife is an album by composer and guitarist Fred Frith's group Maybe Monday which was released on the Winter & Winter label.

Reception

Allmusic gave the album 3½ stars. JazzTimes' Aaron Steinberg observed "Digital Wildlife can sound, at any random point, like chamber-classical, abstract rock or folk. Frith also takes the title of the recording quite seriously: he seems to have taken tapes from the group's live-time improvisations and mixed them into a multilayered, abruptly shifting, densely overlapping collage of machine music. Acoustic and electronic elements have been cut, rearranged and pasted into a dreamy floating space, where any voice could at any time sound thoroughly foregrounded, distant, looped or distorted beyond recognition... Digital Wildlife has ambience to spare, though to most it will sound like a racket. Give this one some time. Frith has carefully crafted his own lexicon of sound, and once you've tuned in to what he's doing this beautiful recording pays dividends".

Track listing
All compositions by Fred Frith, Joan Jeanrenaud, Miya Masaoka and Larry Ochs
 "Digital Wildlife" – 12:11  
 "Image In and Atom" – 9:55  
 "The Prisoners' Dilemma" – 14:30  
 "Touch / Risk" – 7:23  
 "Close to Home" – 4:58

Personnel
Fred Frith – electric guitar
Joan Jeanrenaud – cello
Miya Masaoka – koto, electronics
Larry Ochs – tenor saxophone, sopranino saxophone

References

2002 live albums
Fred Frith live albums
Albums produced by Fred Frith
Winter & Winter Records albums